John H. Schulze (April 4, 1866 – May 19, 1941) was a catcher  in Major League Baseball who played for the  St. Louis Browns of the American Association. He was born in St. Louis, Missouri. Batting side and throwing arm are unknown.

Schulze was a major league player whose career, statistically speaking, was only slightly different from that of Eddie Gaedel or Moonlight Graham. On August 7, 1891, he debuted with the Browns and went hit-less in two at-bats. He did not have a fielding chance, and never appeared in a major league game again.

Schulze died in his native St. Louis at the age of 75.

See also
1891 St. Louis Browns season
Cup of coffee

External links

Retrosheet

19th-century baseball players
Major League Baseball catchers
St. Louis Browns (AA) players
Meadville (minor league baseball) players
Baseball players from St. Louis
1866 births
1941 deaths